Tale may refer to:

 Narrative, or story, a report of real or imaginary connected events
 TAL effector (TALE), a type of DNA binding protein
 Tale, Albania, a resort town
 Tale, Iran, a village
 Tale, Maharashtra, a village in Ratnagiri district, Maharashtra state, India
 River Tale, a small river in the English county of Devon
 The Tale, 2018 American drama film

See also
 Tale-e Rudbar, a village in Iran
 Taleh, a town in Somalia
 Tales (disambiguation)